Frida Karlsson (born 10 August 1999) is a Swedish cross-country skier. She won a silver medal in the women's 10 kilometres classical, bronze medal in the women's 30 kilometre freestyle mass start, and gold as a member of the women's 4 × 5 kilometre relay during the 2019 FIS World Championships in Seefeld in Tirol, Austria. With this win, she became the youngest cross-country skiing World Cup gold medalist in history. In April 2018, she received a 50,000 Swedish kronor prize for promising new skiers from former skier Johan Olsson and a bank. The award also gave her the opportunity to use Olsson as a mentor. Karlsson is the daughter of former cross-country skier Ann-Marie Karlsson.

The 2022–2023 season saw Frida Karlsson winning the Tour de Ski.

Cross-country skiing results
All results are sourced from the International Ski Federation (FIS).

Olympic Games
 1 medal – (1 bronze)

World Championships
 10 medals – (1 gold, 5 silver, 4 bronze)

World Cup

Season titles
 1 title – (2 U23)

Season standings

Individual podiums
 8 victories – (6 , 2 )
 17 podiums – (10 , 6 )

Team podiums
 3  podiums – (3 )

References

External links

1999 births
Living people
Swedish female cross-country skiers
People from Sollefteå Municipality
FIS Nordic World Ski Championships medalists in cross-country skiing
Cross-country skiers from Västernorrland County
Olympic cross-country skiers of Sweden
Cross-country skiers at the 2022 Winter Olympics
Medalists at the 2022 Winter Olympics
Olympic medalists in cross-country skiing
Olympic bronze medalists for Sweden
21st-century Swedish women